Hammondville is the name of the following places:
Hammondville, Alabama, a town in DeKalb county, AL, USA
Hammondville, New South Wales, a suburb of Sydney, Australia